Léon Augustin Lhermitte (31 July 1844, Mont-Saint-Père – 28 July 1925, Paris) was a French naturalist painter and etcher whose primary subject matter was rural scenes depicting peasants at work.

Life and work
He was a student of Lecoq de Boisbaudran, he gained recognition after his show in the Paris Salon in 1864.

His many awards include the French Legion of Honour (1884) and the Grand Prize at the Exposition Universelle in 1889.

Lhermitte’s innovative use of pastels won him the admiration of his contemporaries. Vincent van Gogh wrote that "If every month Le Monde Illustré published one of his compositions ... it would be a great pleasure for me to be able to follow it. It is certain that for years I have not seen anything as beautiful as this scene by Lhermitte ... I am too preoccupied by Lhermitte this evening to be able to talk of other things."

Lhermitte is represented in the permanent collections of museums around the world, including in the Philadelphia Museum of Art, the Metropolitan Museum of Art, the Smithsonian American Art Museum, the Dahesh Museum of Art, the Towneley Hall Art Gallery & Museum, the Glasgow Museums Resource Center, the Victoria and Albert Museum, the Manchester Art Gallery, the Aberdeen Art Gallery and Museums, the Milwaukee Art Museum, the University of Michigan Museum of Art, the Kemper Art Museum, the Thyssen-Bornemisza Museum, the British Museum, the McCord Museum, the Brooklyn Museum, the National Gallery of Canada, the Nelson-Atkins Museum of Art, the Smart Museum of Art, the Chimei Museum, the Saint Louis Art Museum, the Toledo Museum of Art, and the Van Gogh Museum.

Artwork

The Gleaners

Léon-Augustin Lhermitte's The Gleaners (1887, Philadelphia Museum of Art).  A part of the Realism movement and an avid realist painter, Lhermitte depicts the working class poverty in France. Taking very obvious inspiration from Millet, a painting of the same name, Lhermitte in a series of works displayed at the Salon aims to capture this moment in time. When comparing his work to Millet's, even the poses of the women are very similar if not the same. In the foreground there are two women bent over picking up the grains left behind. An obvious difference between this work and Millet's is that there is no large crowd of people working in the background.

Similarly though the women grasp the wheat in their hands on the left is shown a cache of what they have collected. This is vastly different from Millet's as his showed how little there was left. Lhermitte shows quite a bit of excess. When viewing the ground, identifying individual wheat grains is difficult if not impossible. This could be a representation of how difficult the work is, the endless task of gathering enough wheat to keep the families of these women fed. Around the same time the painting by Lhermitte was published and presented at the Salon, Millet's own "The Gleaners" was beginning to receive public appreciation. This led Lhermitte to continue painting scenes of rural France, many of which share the same name, "The Gleaners".

Looking closely at the individual gleaners, they are each given some individual "character". Rather than having plain smooth looking clothes like in Millet's painting, Lhermitte opted for looser fitting shirts and added more detail to the faces of the women. The second woman reaching down has a pained expression on her face, showing the effort of reaching down all day. While the women in Millet's painting share the same traits, the women in Lhermitte's have different expressions. The two standing women each hold their bundle as if they are taking a small break, while the woman at the far end has her hand on her back and an exasperated look on her face.  This piece leaves the viewer without a sense of closure, as it seems the day is just beginning and a hard day of work is still ahead.

References

External links
 

19th-century French painters
French male painters
20th-century French painters
20th-century French male artists
French etchers
1844 births
1925 deaths
Members of the Académie des beaux-arts
Recipients of the Legion of Honour
20th-century French printmakers
19th-century printmakers
19th-century French male artists